Empire Beacon was an  coaster which was built in 1941. She was owned by the Ministry of War Transport (MoWT) and managed by John Stewart & Co (Shipping) Ltd. Empire Beacon struck a mine and sank off St. Ann's Head, Pembrokeshire on 5 April 1942.

Career
Empire Beacon was built by Scott & Sons Ltd, Bowling, West Dunbartonshire. She was yard number 358 and was launched on 24 September 1941 and completed in November that year. Empire Beacon was built for the MoWT and placed under the management of John Stewart & Co (Shipping) Ltd. Her port of registry was Glasgow.

Sinking

Official Numbers and Code Letters

Official numbers were a forerunner to IMO Numbers. Empire Beacon had the UK Official Number 168695 and used the Code Letters BCSY.

Propulsion
Empire Beacon was powered a Single Cycle, Single Action oil engines, driving a single screw. The cylinders were 13 in (340mm) diameter by 22 in (570 mm) stroke. The engine developed .

References

1941 ships
Ships built on the River Clyde
Empire ships
Ministry of War Transport ships
Ships sunk by mines
Shipwrecks in the Bristol Channel
Maritime incidents in April 1942